Alcithoe larochei  ostenfeldi is a subspecies of very large sea snail, a marine gastropod mollusc in the family Volutidae, the volutes.

Description
The height of this shell attains 170mm, its width 73mm.

Distribution
This marine subspecies is endemic to New Zealand.

References

 Iredale, T 1937 Notes on neozelanic deepwater marine Mollusca. Records of the Australian Museum 20: 103-107
 Powell A W B, New Zealand Mollusca, William Collins Publishers Ltd, Auckland, New Zealand 1979 
 Bail, P., Limpus, A. 2005: A Conchological Iconography 11, The Recent Volutes of New Zealand, with a revision of the genus Alcithoe H. & A. Adams, 1853, ConchBooks, Hackenheim, Germany

Volutidae
Gastropods of New Zealand